Prionoderita is a genus of leaf beetles in the subfamily Eumolpinae. It is known from Bolivia, and contains only one species, Prionoderita nixa. The genus is named for its resemblance to Prionodera; the Spanish diminutive suffix -ita refers to the small size of P. nixa, which has a length of 6.5 mm.

References

Eumolpinae
Beetles of South America
Invertebrates of Bolivia
Monotypic Chrysomelidae genera